Munster Rugby is one of the four professional provincial rugby teams from the island of Ireland. They compete in the United Rugby Championship and the European Rugby Champions Cup. Munster first competed in European rugby completions in the first ever Heineken Cup in  1995-96. They have won the competition on two occasions in 2006 and 2008.

Heineken Cup / European Rugby Champions Cup

European Rugby Challenge Cup

Heineken Cup Record

Quarter-final

European Challenge Cup Record

Munster entered the competition as one of the top 3 2010-11 Heineken Cup pool runners-up who failed to qualify for the Heineken Cup quarter-finals.

References

Europe
European Rugby Champions Cup